Rhombodera handschini is a species of praying mantises in the family Mantidae, found in Timor.

See also
List of mantis genera and species

References

H
Mantodea of Asia
Insects described in 1933